Camp Scatico is a brother-sister sleep-away camp for boys and girls located in the upper Hudson Valley of New York State, in the hamlet of Elizaville, which is in the town of Gallatin in Columbia County.

History

Camp Scatico has been in operation since 1921. It was founded by Nat Holman of the Original Celtics. Holman sold the camp to his niece Ruth (1921–2011) and her husband Irwin “Flick” Fleischner (1922–2004) in 1964, and the camp is currently owned and operated by their son David Fleischner, his wife Diana Wallerstein, and their older daughter Nicki Fleischner. It is the site where Camp MTV was taped, which aired Sunday, July 30, 1989.

Notables
A substantial number of the camp's attendees have achieved enormous success. Notables who attended the camp include four-time Olympic fencer Daniel Bukantz, singer Lesley Gore, Hollywood financier Mordecai Wiczyk, businessman Marvin Davis, actor Cornel Wilde, Senator Paul S. Sarbanes, author Erica Jong, Judge Wilfred Feinberg, comedians Julie Klausner and Modi Rosenfeld, movie director and screenwriter Zak Penn, sportscaster Jimmy Roberts, record executives James Diener and Len Fichtelberg, writer-producer-director Scott Goldstein, songwriter Carole Bayer Sager,

References

External links

 Official Web site

Scatico
Youth organizations based in New York (state)
Buildings and structures in Columbia County, New York